Bedlam is a 1946 American horror film starring Boris Karloff and Anna Lee, and was the last in a series of stylish horror B films produced by Val Lewton for RKO Radio Pictures. The film was inspired by William Hogarth's 1732–1734 painting series A Rake's Progress, and Hogarth was given a writing credit.

Plot
Set in 1761 in London, the film focuses on events at an asylum for the mentally ill, a fictionalized version of Bedlam (the Bethlem Royal Hospital). After an acquaintance of Lord Mortimer dies in an attempt to escape from the asylum, Master George Sims (a fictionalized version of an infamous head physician at Bethlem, John Monro), appeases Mortimer by having his "loonies" put on a show for him. Mortified by the treatment of the patients, Mortimer's protégée Nell Bowen seeks his aid, then seeks the help of Whig politician John Wilkes to reform the asylum, threatening Sim's corrupt practices.

Mortimer and Sims conspire to commit Nell to the asylum, where her initial fears of the fellow inmates do not alter her sympathetic commitment to improving their conditions as she tends to the comfort of her fellow inmates. Alarmed by Bowen's imminent release, following legal pressure from Wilkes, Sims plans to apply his most drastic "cure" to her, but his attempt is thwarted by the inmates whom Nell has helped. Sims is deposed, and Nell escapes and is reunited with her Quaker friend Hannay, who counselled her through the whole process.

Cast

Release

Theatrical release
The movie recorded a loss of $40,000.

Home media
The film has been released on DVD by Warner Bros. as part of a double release with Isle Of The Dead and as part of the Val Lewton Horror Collection, and features a commentary by film historian Tom Weaver.

Reception

Initial reception

Later reception
Film critic Leonard Maltin awarded the film three out of a possible four stars, commending the film's atmosphere.

See also
 Boris Karloff filmography

References

External links

 
 
 
 
 

1940s horror thriller films
1946 films
American horror thriller films
American black-and-white films
Films scored by Roy Webb
Films directed by Mark Robson
Films produced by Val Lewton
RKO Pictures films
Films set in London
Films set in psychiatric hospitals
Films set in 1761
Works based on art
1946 horror films
1940s English-language films
1940s American films